Brimstone is a 1949 American Trucolor Western film directed by Joseph Kane and written by Thames Williamson. The film stars Rod Cameron, Lorna Gray, Walter Brennan, Forrest Tucker, Jack Holt and Jim Davis. The film was released on August 15, 1949, by Republic Pictures.

Plot

Pop "Brimstone" Courteen (Walter Brennan) and his sons, Nick, Luke and Bud, run a ranch outside the town of Gunsight, and are none too happy about the recent arrival of homesteaders in the area. Determined to cut off the interlopers' supplies, the Courteens rob incoming stagecoaches and even the local bank. But things change when a U.S. marshal (Rod Cameron) arrives in town to investigate, and Bud falls in love with one of the hated homesteaders.

Cast    
Rod Cameron as Johnny Tremaine
Lorna Gray as Molly Bannister 
Walter Brennan as Brimstone 'Pop' Courteen
Forrest Tucker as Sheriff Henry McIntyre
Jack Holt as Marshal Walter Greenslide
Jim Davis as Nick Courteen
James Brown as Bud Courteen
Guinn "Big Boy" Williams as Deputy Art Benson
Jack Lambert as Luke Courteen
Will Wright as Martin Tredwell
David Williams as Todd Bannister
Harry Cheshire as Calvin Willis 
Hal Taliaferro as Dave Watts 
Herbert Rawlinson as Storekeeper
Stanley Andrews as Edward Winslow 
Charlita as Chiquita

References

External links 
 
 http://brimstone.fun

1949 films
American Western (genre) films
1949 Western (genre) films
Republic Pictures films
Films directed by Joseph Kane
Films scored by Nathan Scott
Trucolor films
1940s English-language films
1940s American films